R73 or R-73 may refer to:

 R-73 (missile), a Soviet air-to-air missile
 R73 (South Africa), a road
 , a destroyer of the Royal Navy